Diego Sebastián Laxalt Suárez (born 7 February 1993) is a Uruguayan professional footballer who plays as a left-back for Russian Premier League club Dynamo Moscow and the Uruguay national team. He is a youth product of Defensor Sporting, having passed through the youth ranks in July 2012.

Club career

Defensor Sporting
Born in Montevideo, Laxalt made his professional debut on 1 September 2012 with Defensor Sporting in a 4–0 win against Montevideo Wanderers. On 24 February 2013, after the  South American Championship football Under-20 in 2013, he returned to the field with the jersey of Violeta in the away game against Nacional. He concluded his first season with 15 appearances and 1 goal.

Inter Milan
Inter Milan bought Laxalt in January 2013, with the deal completed in July 2013. The then new coach of Inter Milan, Walter Mazzarri, however, did not include him in the pre-season squad. He spent the season on loan at Bologna.

After returning from loan, he was included in the pre-season squad by Walter Mazzarri. On 13 August 2014, Empoli announced the loan signing of Laxalt with Inter Milan entitled to the right of a counter-purchase.

Genoa
On 30 January 2015, Genoa signed Laxalt on loan for 18 months with an optional purchase clause. He scored his first 2 goals for Genoa on 28 October 2015, in an away match against Torino.

On 30 July 2016, Laxalt joined Genoa on a permanent deal, with Cristian Ansaldi moving in the opposite direction.

AC Milan
On 16 August 2018, Laxalt joined fellow Serie A club AC Milan in a deal worth a reported €14 million plus a further €4 million in potential bonuses, with striker Gianluca Lapadula moving in the opposite direction for €11 million. He made his competitive debut for the club on 25 August 2018, coming on as a 71st minute substitute for Fabio Borini in a 3-2 league defeat to Napoli.

2019–20 season: Loan to Torino and recall
With both Theo Hernandez and Ricardo Rodríguez in front of him at left back, Laxalt was deemed surplus to and on 31 August 2019, transferred to Torino, on a season-long loan deal with an option to buy. On 31 January 2020, Laxalt was recalled from his loan to be the back up for Hernandez after Rodríguez had left to join Eredivisie side PSV on loan. During the course of his loan, Laxalt made only 5 starts in all competitions for Torino but came off the bench 13 times including against parent-club Milan in the Coppa Italia a week before his return.

2020–21 season: Loan to Celtic
On 5 October 2020, Laxalt completed a season-long loan to Scottish club Celtic. He made his debut at Celtic Park against Rangers in the Old Firm Derby, and his next game was against his parent club, Milan in the Europa League . He scored his first goal for Celtic when scoring a late equaliser in a 2–2 draw against Hibernian on 21 November 2020. Laxalt won the first major honour of his career when he played for Celtic in their penalty shoot-out victory against Hearts in the rescheduled 2020 Scottish Cup Final. The match was originally scheduled to take place at Hampden Park on 9 May 2020, but was postponed prior to the semi-finals as a result of the COVID-19 pandemic in Scotland.

Dynamo Moscow
On 22 June 2021, Dynamo Moscow announced the signing of Laxalt on a 3-year contract with an option to extend for one more season. It is reported that the cost of the transfer was €3.5 million, and the player's salary will be €2.5 million per year.

International career

2013 South American Youth Championship
He made his debut with Uruguay in the 2013 South American Youth Championship in Argentina, on 10 January 2013 in the 3–3 draw against Peru. Two days later, he scored his first goal in the 6th minute in an eventual 3–2 win over Brazil. On 18 January, his team finished 2nd in Group B, behind Peru.

On 3 February, he completed all games played, and Uruguay qualified for the 2013 FIFA U-20 World Cup in Turkey and was included in the best XI of the event.

2013 FIFA U-20 World Cup
After contributing to qualification for the 2013 FIFA U–20 World Cup, he was included in the squad for the event. He made his debut on 2 June 2013, in the 1–0 defeat against Croatia, where he played the full 90 minutes. The first victory in the group stage came in the next game, as Uruguay beat New Zealand 2–0. Laxalt was substituted in the 82nd minute for Gonzalo Bueno.

Uruguay also won the last game of the group stage against Uzbekistan, 4–0, the game that allowed Uruguay to qualify for the next round in 2nd place with 6 points, only behind Croatia. In the second round, Uruguay defeated Nigeria, with a 2-1 result, where he was substituted for Gonzalo Bueno in the 77th minute. On 6 July, at the quarter-final against Spain, the game went to extra time.

Senior
Laxalt was called up to Uruguay's Copa America Centenario squad to replace the injured Cristian Rodríguez. He made his full debut against Ireland on 4 June 2017. He was called up to the full Uruguay squad for the China Cup in March 2018.

In May 2018, he was named in Uruguay's provisional 26-man squad for the 2018 World Cup in Russia.

Style of play
Laxalt is left-footed, physically strong and very versatile. He has described himself by saying that: "My strengths are speed and endurance. I'm a left-footed midfielder who can fit in other positions." He has compared himself to the Inter Milan legend, Álvaro Recoba, who is also a former Uruguayan midfielder.

Career statistics

Club

International

Honours

Club
Celtic 
Scottish Cup: 2019–20

International
Uruguay U20
FIFA U-20 World Cup runner-up: 2013

References

1993 births
Living people
Footballers from Montevideo
Association football fullbacks
Association football wingers
Uruguayan footballers
Uruguay under-20 international footballers
Uruguay international footballers
Copa América Centenario players
2018 FIFA World Cup players
2019 Copa América players
Uruguayan Primera División players
Serie A players
Scottish Professional Football League players
Russian Premier League players
Defensor Sporting players
Inter Milan players
Bologna F.C. 1909 players
Empoli F.C. players
Genoa C.F.C. players
A.C. Milan players
Torino F.C. players
Celtic F.C. players
FC Dynamo Moscow players
Uruguayan people of French descent
Uruguayan expatriate footballers
Expatriate footballers in Italy
Uruguayan expatriate sportspeople in Italy
Expatriate footballers in Scotland
Uruguayan expatriate sportspeople in Scotland
Expatriate footballers in Russia
Uruguayan expatriate sportspeople in Russia